Parliamentary elections are expected to be held in North Macedonia in 2024.

Electoral system

Of the 123 seats in the Assembly of the Republic, 120 are elected from six 20-seat constituencies in North Macedonia using closed list proportional representation, with seats allocated using the d'Hondt method. The remaining three seats are elected by Macedonians living abroad, but are only filled if the number of votes exceeds that of the elected candidate with the fewest votes in North Macedonia in the previous election. If a list crosses this threshold, it wins one seat; to win two seats, a list needs to win twice the number of votes, and to win three seats the threshold is three times the number of votes. These seats were not filled in the 2016 elections due to insufficient turnout.

Opinion polls

Notes

References

North Macedonia
Parliamentary election
Elections in North Macedonia
North Macedonia